Develin may refer to:

James Develin (b. 1988), American football player
Mike Develin (b. 1980), American mathematician
Develin Peak, in British Columbia, Canada
USS Develin (AMc-45), US Navy ship
the European swift